Members of the New South Wales Legislative Assembly  who served in the 18th parliament of New South Wales held their seats between 1898 and 1901. They were elected at the 1898 colonial election on 27 July 1898. The Speaker was Sir Joseph Abbott until 12 June 1900 and then William McCourt.

By-elections

Under the constitution, ministers were required to resign to recontest their seats in a by-election when appointed. These by-elections are only noted when the minister was defeated; in general, he was elected unopposed.

See also
 Reid ministry
 Lyne ministry
 Results of the 1898 New South Wales colonial election
 Candidates of the 1898 New South Wales colonial election

Notes

References

Members of New South Wales parliaments by term
20th-century Australian politicians
19th-century Australian politicians